is a 1986 Japanese film directed by Sō Kuramoto.

Cast
 Ayumi Ishida
 Tetsuya Watari
 Kunie Tanaka
 Hideo Murota
 Minori Terada
 Masumi Okada
 Toshiyuki Nagashima
 Eri Ishida
 Midori Satsuki

Awards and nominations
29th Blue Ribbon Awards
 Won: Best Actress - Ayumi Ishida
11th Hochi Film Award 
 Won: Best Actress - Ayumi Ishida

References

1986 films
1980s Japanese-language films
Films with screenplays by Sô Kuramoto
1980s Japanese films